National Theatre of Karelia is a 1932 established theatre in Petrozavodsk, Republic of Karelia, Russia. It is the only Finnish  language theatre in Russia. The theater is also the main platform for plays in Karelian and Vepsian on Russia.

References 

Buildings and structures in Petrozavodsk
Theatres in Russia
Arts organizations established in 1932
1932 establishments in Russia
Cultural heritage monuments of regional significance in the Republic of Karelia